Claude Lambert (born February 16, 1969 in Montreal, Quebec) is a retired boxer from Canada, who competed in the bantamweight (< 54 kg) division at the 1996 Summer Olympics in Atlanta, Georgia. There he was stopped in the first round by Thailand's Vichairachanon Khadpo (the eventual bronze medalist). A year earlier, he had captured the bronze medal himself at the Pan American Games in Mar del Plata, Argentina. He also represented Canada at the 1994 Commonwealth Games.

External links
 Canadian Olympic Committee

References

1969 births
Bantamweight boxers
Boxers at the 1994 Commonwealth Games
Boxers at the 1995 Pan American Games
Boxers at the 1996 Summer Olympics
Living people
Olympic boxers of Canada
Pan American Games bronze medalists for Canada
Commonwealth Games competitors for Canada
Boxers from Montreal
Canadian male boxers
Pan American Games medalists in boxing
Medalists at the 1995 Pan American Games